A A Dhand (Amit Dhand) is a British-Asian crime-writer. His recent books are set in the West Yorkshire city of Bradford, a former industrial city very much a shadow of its former self and rife with social deprivation, crime and complex inter-communal challenges.

Background
Raised in Bradford and the son of an immigrant corner shop owner. He attended the prestigious Fulneck Boarding School in Leeds (of which features in his novels). He originally trained as a pharmacist and worked in London, but returned to his home town to start a pharmacy business and write books.

He is now a regular contributor to a number of British Asian and crime writers' fora.

Writing
Dhand's first novel featured a character Ranjit Singh and is set against the Partition of India and Pakistan in 1947; but it has been his more recent novels that have won him critical acclaim. These have featured the Bradford-based police detective Harry Virdee, a progressive British Sikh who struggles with his cultural identity and family loyalties. Race, violence and exploitation are on the agenda in the Virdee novels, and Dhand has not shied away from controversial issues of tension between British Asian communities and the controversy over such issues as the 'grooming' of vulnerable females by organised gangs of men. Dhand is fairly unique as he sets his protagonists (who are shaped by Asian culture) in a British setting.

His novel Streets of Darkness is being developed as a TV drama.

Bibliography
 Fields of Blood (2015) (featuring character Ranjit Singh)
 Streets of Darkness (Bantam Press - 16 June 2016) (featuring character Harry Virdee)
 Girl Zero (Bantam Press - 13 July 2017) (featuring character Harry Virdee)
 City of Sinners (Bantam Press - 28 June 2018) (featuring character Harry Virdee)
 One Way Out (Bantam Press - 27 June 2019) (featuring character Harry Virdee)

References

External links
A A Dhand’s Website

Penguin Authors
A A Dhand Blog and Photography

Year of birth missing (living people)
Living people
English crime fiction writers
English thriller writers
English male novelists
Writers from Bradford